Wimpole Road (not to be confused with Wimpole Street) is named after the village of Wimpole and may refer to:
Part of the A603 in Cambridgeshire, running through Barton
Wimpole Road in  Great Eversden, Cambridgeshire
Wimpole Road in Colchester, Essex
Part of the Princes Freeway